Pascal Godart (dates unknown) is a French classical pianist.

Biography 
Godart learned to play the piano at age five with Renée Entremont, pianist Philippe Entremont's mother, then with Yvonne Loriod and won a first prize for piano, chamber music and accompaniment at the Conservatoire de Paris. He also worked the piano with Pierre Réach and Vadim Sakharov.

He won international piano competitions in Milan (Dino Ciani Competition, 1993, 2nd prize), Cleveland (Robert Casadesus Competition (1989), 4th prize), Tokyo (1992) and Porto (1990) and won the Grand Prix Maria Callas in Athens in 1996. In addition to the works of Chopin and Ravel, his repertoire includes concertos by Rachmaninov, Brahms, Mozart and Beethoven among others.

During a concert tour with the Dnipro orchestra, he performed Mozart's piano concertos, also as a conductor. He recorded works by Schubert, Stravinsky, and Dutilleux.

Since 2010, he has been professor at the Hemu (Lausanne site) and from 2012, at the Tibor Varga music academy at Sion.

Godart was a member of the jury at the International Maria Callas Grand Prix 2010 in Athens, and of the preselection committee at the 2014 Geneva International Piano Competition.

References

External links 
 Official website
 Pianobleu website
 Interview with Pascal Godart on Pianodoux
 Lausanne Concert 2016 Pavel Vernikov - Henri Demarquette - Pascal Godart (YouTube)

21st-century French male classical pianists
20th-century French male classical pianists
Date of birth missing (living people)
Year of birth missing (living people)
Living people
Conservatoire de Paris alumni